(abbreviated to NPO ; literally "Dutch Public Broadcaster") or Dutch Foundation for Public Broadcasting is a Dutch public broadcasting organisation that administers public broadcasting services in the Netherlands. The NPO is also the owner of the radio-spectrum licence and public DVB-T and DAB+ frequencies.

Media Act 2008 

According to Article 2.2 the Dutch Media Act of 2008, NPO has been appointed as the governing organisation of the public broadcasting system of the Netherlands until 2020. At the head of the organisation there are two bodies: the board of directors that administers the whole public television and radio broadcasting system; and the supervisory board.

History 

Prior to the reorganisation in the 2000s, the Dutch public broadcasting system was managed by another public broadcasting organisation, Nederlandse Omroep Stichting (NOS) Which has since become member of the new organization.

On 18 May 2019, following the Netherlands' victory at the Eurovision Song Contest 2019 with Duncan Laurence's song "Arcade", it was announced that the Netherlands and NPO (with public broadcasters AVROTROS and NOS) would host the Eurovision Song Contest 2020 in Rotterdam; the contest was later cancelled due to the COVID-19 pandemic, and Rotterdam was later retained as the host for the following year's contest.

Objectives 
The objectives of NPO are:
 Promoting cooperation and cohesion among national broadcasters
 Providing broadcasters with air time / space in the media
 Distributing the budget between broadcasters
 Providing distribution (sales) and subtitling support for broadcasters
 Conducting independent research on the quality and consumer image of radio, television, and web platforms

Representation in international organisations 
NPO is an active member of the European Broadcasting Union.

Awards 
In 2013, NPO became the winner of the Prix Europa award for the Best TV Fiction Script by a Newcomer (for the screenplay of the film The Deflowering of Eva Van End, written by Anne Barnhoorn in collaboration with NPO).

Logos

References

Further reading 
 Media act and media policy — Government.nl
 Broadcasters — Government.nl

External links 

  

Foundations based in the Netherlands
Netherlands Public Broadcasting
Publicly funded broadcasters
Dutch public broadcasting organisations
Dutch-language television networks
European Broadcasting Union members
Mass media in Hilversum
State media
Mass media companies established in 2000